Fraternal Order of Eagles (F.O.E.) is a fraternal organization that was founded on February 6, 1898, in Seattle, Washington, by a group of six theater owners including John Cort (the first president), brothers John W. and Tim J. Considine, Harry (H.L.) Leavitt (who later joined the Loyal Order of Moose), Mose Goldsmith and Arthur Williams. Originally made up of those engaged in one way or another in the performing arts, the Eagles grew and claimed credit for establishing the Mother's Day holiday in the United States as well as the "impetus for Social Security" in the United States. Their lodges are known as "aeries".

History

The Fraternal Order of Eagles was founded on February 6, 1898. The organization was formed by six theater owners sitting on a pile of lumber in Moran's shipyard in Seattle, Washington. They were competitors who had come together to discuss a musicians' strike. After deciding how to handle the strike, they agreed to "bury the hatchet" and form an organization dubbed "The Order of Good Things".

Early meetings were held on local theater stages, and after taking care of business, attendees rolled out a keg of beer and enjoyed social time. As numbers grew, participants selected the bald eagle as the official emblem and changed the name to "The Fraternal Order of Eagles". In April 1898, the membership formed a Grand Aerie, secured a charter and developed a constitution and by-laws, with John Cort elected the Eagles' first president.

Touring theater troupes are credited with much of the Eagles' rapid growth. Most early members were actors, stagehands and playwrights, who carried the Eagles story as they toured across the United States and Canada. The organization's appeal is also attributed to its funeral benefits (no Eagle was ever knowingly buried in a potter's field), the provision of an aerie physician, and other membership benefits.
The Eagles pushed for the founding of Mother's Day, provided the impetus for Social Security, and pushed to end job discrimination based on age. The Eagles have provided support for medical centers across the United States and Canada to build and provide research on medical conditions. Every year they raise millions of dollars to combat heart disease and cancer, help children with disabilities, and uplift the aged and infirm.

History of the Aerie 

An aerie in nature is the lofty nest of any bird of prey, including eagles and hawks. In the Fraternal Order of Eagles, the term Aerie is the name of the building in which the members meet and hold events.

History of the Auxiliary 

A "new era for the women of Eagledom" began when an amendment to the Grand Aerie Laws to establish a Grand Auxiliary passed unanimously at the 1951 Grand Aerie Convention in Rochester, New York. Eagle Auxiliaries had existed before the Grand Auxiliary was formed, the first being founded on March 24, 1927, in Pittsburg, Kansas. Three days later, a second Auxiliary was established in Frontenac, Kansas. By March 1951, 965 local Auxiliaries were in existence, totaling 130,000 members. By the end of that year, 22 state and provincial Auxiliaries were also operating.

Timeline 

 1898 – "Order of Good Things" established. Later that year, the organization changed its name to Fraternal Order of Eagles and formed the first Aerie.
 1904 – F.O.E. starts advocating for Mother's Day
 1927 – Creation and formation of the Ladies Auxiliary
 1935 – Support for enactment of Social Security Law
 1944 – Eagles Memorial Fund established
 1954 – Nearly 10,000 Ten Commandments plaques distributed
 1955 – F.O.E. Ten Commandments monument placed in Ambridge, PA. F.O.E. Ten Commandments monument placed on the grounds of a state capital, Denver, Colorado
 1957 – Nationwide "Jobs After 40" program inaugurated
 1967 – Jimmy Durante Children's Foundation established
 1972 – Golden Eagle Fund established
 1983 – Max Baer Heart Fund offered first grants for Aerie-sponsored CPR classes $405,000 donated to Eagles' Truman Cardiovascular Lab at Research Medical Center, Kansas City Golden Eagle Fund donated $5,000 in grants to institutions conducting Alzheimer's disease research
 1985 – Donations to St. Jude Hospital top $1 million
 1988 – Eagles matched grants up to $500 to sponsor Drug Education Seminars
 1991 – Eagles supported Operation Desert Storm with mail and food packages
 1995 – $50,000 donated for the Eagle Alcove of the Franklin Delano Roosevelt Memorial in Washington, D.C. (Roosevelt was a lifetime F.O.E. member)
 2001 – Memorial Foundation established Attack on America Fund and raised $500,000 F.O.E. purchased property to consolidate international headquarters
 2002 – International headquarters opened in Grove City, Ohio
 2005 – Eagles rededicated Ten Commandments monument at international headquarters F.O.E. generously supported development of a new scoliosis brace named the "Eagle Brace" F.O.E. signed first year contract with Braun Racing for FOE.com-sponsored car
 2006 – Eagles worked with local government leaders to keep "under God" in the Pledge of Allegiance. F.O.E. signed second year contract with Braun Racing
 2007 – Eagles supported American Eagle & Literary Challenge in quest to name June 20 National Eagle Day, The Disaster Relief Fund was passed which will allow the Eagles to have "trailers" stocked with supplies to be a first response team.
 2008 – $25 million gift commitment to fund The Fraternal Order of Eagles Diabetes Research Center at The University of Iowa.

Structure and Organization

Local units are called "Aeries". There were 1,400 Aeries scattered across the US and Canada in 2001. The national convention is known as the "Grand Aerie" and meets annually. "Grand Aerie" is also the name of the headquarters of the organization, currently at Grove City, Ohio.

Aeries are known by their instituting number and the name of the city in which they are located. The Aerie instituting number is appointed based on the order in which an Aerie is instituted; at current date the Grand Aerie is instituting Aeries in the 4500 range. Aerie #1, located in Seattle, Washington, is sometimes referred to as "The Mother Aerie".

The Grand Aerie Fraternal Order of Eagles International Convention is held each year in a different city in either the United States or Canada. During the International Convention, delegates from all Aeries and Auxiliaries vote on the new Grand Aerie and Grand Auxiliary representatives, new by-laws and other relevant issues.

Officers

Officers of the Fraternal Order of Eagles, on a local and international level, are elected each year by popular vote of their delegates. State and regional leaders are appointed each year by the Grand Worthy and Grand Madam Presidents.

The organization is led by the two highest elected positions, the Grand Worthy President and the Grand Madam President. The Grand Worthy and Grand Madam Presidents serve a one-year term touring the two countries meeting and celebrating milestone events with all Aerie and Auxiliary members.

The Grand Aerie Officers are the operating body of the Fraternal Order of Eagles between conventions and work with the Board of Grand Trustees and the Grand Auxiliary. The Board of Grand Trustees, with the exception of the chairman of the board, is also an elected body. The chairman of the board is the immediate past Grand Worthy President.

Membership 

At one point the qualifications for membership were that one must be 21 years old, possess a good character, not be a Communist and be a Caucasian. By the late 1970s the all-white provision had officially been rescinded, but, because the Order used the blackball to admit new members, it was difficult for minorities to gain membership. In 1979 the FOE tried to get a lawsuit dismissed that alleged it was violating the Civil Rights Act of 1964 by not allowing African Americans to use their athletic facilities.  The article stated that a local Eagle official could only cite Joe Louis as a black member of the FOE.

In 1979 the Order had 800,000 members, a figure said to have been relatively constant over a decade. In 2011, it had 850,000 members in the main organization and 250,000 members of the women's auxiliary.

As of 2019, membership is open to any person of good moral character, and believes in the existence of a supreme being, and is not a member of the Communist Party nor any organization which advocates the overthrow of the United States government. Currently, either gender can become a member of an Aerie, however, only women can become a member of an Auxiliary. In recent history, numerous Aerie chapters have absorbed their Auxiliaries to form one unified chapter that allows all genders, to which the Grand Aerie and Grand Auxiliary responded with enacting a law that any Auxiliary members who wish to leave the women's only chapter and join the Aerie, must be a non-member of the entire organization for one full year, which has discouraged countless members from doing so.

The FOE no longer uses secret passwords or "roughhouse initiation" rites. But, in 1979, it still had a ritual. The prospective member was asked to promise before God and on his honor, not to disclose the rituals of the Order to anyone outside of the FOE. The initiation took place in a lodge room furnished with an altar and a Bible and included religious phrases and prayers.

The FOE had an insurance program in its early years, but discontinued this in 1927. Instead it offered sick and death benefits for members who would pay higher fees. Therefore, the FOE now has two membership categories, beneficial and non-beneficial.

Charitable giving
"People helping people" is a statement that guides the charitable actions of the Fraternal Order of Eagles and has led the Eagles to donate more than $100 million annually. As part of the charitable philosophy, the Eagles give back 100 percent of the contributions received in the form of grants. All administrative costs are paid by the International Organization through membership dues.

In 1941 the FOE donated funds for the construction of a dormitory at Boys Town, Nebraska. Father Flanagan, the founder of Boys Town, was member of the order. A few years later the Order sponsored the creation of Eagle Hall at the Range for Boys at Sentinel Butte, North Dakota. The High Girl Ranch, near Midland, Texas has also received a dormitory.

The Memorial Foundation was founded in 1946, and regularly supports medical research projects.  In the 1970s the FOE joined environmentalists in efforts to save the bald eagle from extinction. They also lent their efforts to help the golden eagle as well.  In 1959 the FOE began construction on a retirement home for elderly members in Bradenton, Florida. Today this home is part of Eagle Village, where there are other facilities available to the elderly.

Government Relations
Since the time of the New Deal the FOE has promoted social legislation, particularly old age and mothers pensions, Social Security and workmen's compensation. By 1980 it was advocating for seniors to work after age 65 and to return the Social Security system back to its original purpose.

Mother's Day

Frank E. Hering, a Past Grand Worthy President of the Fraternal Order of Eagles in South Bend, Indiana, campaigned for "a national day to honor our mothers", nearly 35 years after social activist Ann Jarvis first proposed a similar U.S. holiday. The idea of advocating for Mother's Day came to Hering when he was a faculty member at the University of Notre Dame. Walking into the classroom of a fellow instructor, Hering found his colleague distributing penny postcards to students. Each student addressed his or her card and scribbled a message on it. Hering was informed the students could write anything, as long as it was addressed to the students' mothers.

Hering leveraged his connection with the Fraternal Organization of Eagles to organize its members in promoting the holiday, and in 1914, legislation in the U.S. Congress requested a presidential proclamation to designate the second Sunday in May as Mother's Day. This date was encouraged by Anna Marie Jarvis, daughter of Ann Jarvis who continued her mother's work in crusading for a U.S. memorial day for mothers. President Woodrow Wilson signed the proclamation and May 10, 1914, became the first official Mother's Day.

In 1925, the "Society of War Mothers" invited Hering to participate in a special Mother's Day ceremony at Arlington National Cemetery. There, at the "Tomb of the Unknown Soldier", before a large audience including many congressmen and senators, Hering was introduced as "the Father of Mother's Day". That was 11 years after President Woodrow Wilson by Proclamation officially made Mother's Day the second Sunday in May.

Today the Eagles' work to acknowledge mothers on Mother's Day is recognized by the Anna Jarvis Birthplace Museum – a museum honoring the daughter of Ann Jarvis. Grand Madam President Margaret Cox (2007–2008), was named "2008 Mother of the Year" by the Anna Jarvis Birthplace Museum in partnership with the International Mother's Day Shrine in Grafton, WV. Cox was honored at the 100th anniversary of the holiday during the Mother's Day Founder's Festival, May 10 and 11, 2008.

Ten Commandments
In the 1940s, E.J. Ruegemer, a Minnesota juvenile court judge and member of the Fraternal Order of Eagles, launched
a nationwide campaign to post copies of the Ten Commandments in juvenile courts across the country.
His stated goal was to provide a moral foundation for troubled youth.

In 1956, director Cecil B. DeMille's epic film "The Ten Commandments" opened across the country. DeMille and Ruegemer drummed up publicity for the film by working together to erect granite monuments
of the Ten Commandments across the nation.

Although there is no official record of how many monuments were erected, estimates range from less than 100 to more than 2,000. The Fraternal Order of Eagles kept the project going long after the film opened, and some monuments didn't get erected until up to 10 years later. Many monuments went up in public places like parks, city halls, and courthouses.
On August 30, 1961, the Fraternal Order of Eagles of Texas presented the State of Texas with a 6-foot-high monolith inscribed with the Ten Commandments, which in 2006 became the subject of a divisive and controversial legal dispute (Van Orden v. Perry) that reached the U.S. Supreme Court. The case was ruled 5–4 in favor of the defendant, the State of Texas, and the monument was allowed to remain on the grounds of the State Capitol.

Notable Eagles buildings

 Eagles Auditorium Building, Seattle, Washington
 Eagles Building (Dayton, Ohio)
 Eagles Building (Lorain, Ohio)
 Eagles Building-Strand Theater, Alliance, Ohio
 Eagles Club, Milwaukee, Wisconsin
 Eagles Hall (San Diego, California)
 Eagles Home, Evansville, Indiana
 Eagles Temple (Akron, Ohio)
 Eagles Temple (Canton, Ohio)
 Fraternal Order of Eagles Building, Richmond, Virginia

Notable Eagles

United States Presidents 
Seven United States Presidents have held membership in the Fraternal Order of Eagles:
 Theodore Roosevelt – Cheyenne, Wyoming, 26th President
 Warren G. Harding – Marion, Ohio, 29th President
 Franklin D. Roosevelt – Buffalo, New York, 32nd President
 Harry S. Truman – Independence, Missouri, 33rd president
 John F. Kennedy – Hyde Park, Massachusetts, 35th President
 James Earl "Jimmy" Carter – Atlanta, Georgia, 39th President,
 Ronald Reagan – Santa Barbara, California, 40th President,

Politicians 
 Jack Christian, Louisiana politician
 William Allen Egan, Governor, Alaska
 J. Edgar Hoover, FBI Director
 Joe Manchin, West Virginia US Senator
 John J. McClure, Pennsylvania State Senator
 Walter Mondale, vice president
 Earl Warren, Chief Justice of the United States
 Ron Estes, Kansas Congressman

Religion 
 Father Edward J. Flanagan, founder of Boys Town

Entertainers 
Carol Burnett, comedian and actor
 Alice Cooper, musical performer and entertainer
 Billy Ray Cyrus, musical performer and entertainer
 Bob Hope, comedian and actor
 Jimmy Durante, musical performer and entertainer
 Tony Orlando, musical performer and entertainer
 Charlie Daniels, musical performer and entertainer
 Lee Greenwood, musical performer and entertainer
 Louise Mandrell, musical performer and entertainer
 Wayne Newton, musical performer and entertainer
 Bret Michaels, musical performer

Athletes
 Max Baer, boxer/heavyweight champion
 Jim Crowley, College Football Hall of Fame member, one of the Four Horsemen
 Joe Foss, WWII "ace" pilot, first commissioner of the AFL
 Bob Griese, Super Bowl winning quarterback
 Sam Hornish Jr., IRL and NASCAR driver
 Jim Houston, College Football Hall of Fame member
 Gordie Howe, Hockey Hall of Fame member
 Johnny Longden, jockey, Honorary Lifetime Member
 Joe Kahut, Boxer
 Joe Louis, boxer (claimed)
 Roger Maris, baseball player
 Earl Morrall, NFL Most Valuable Player 1968
 Stan Musial, Baseball Hall of Fame member
 Joe Nuxhall, pitcher and broadcaster
 Arnold Palmer, golfer
 Art Rooney, founder of the Pittsburgh Steelers
 Red Schoendienst, Baseball Hall of Fame member
 Warren Spahn, Baseball Hall of Fame member
 Tony Stewart, NASCAR driver
 Jerry Quarry, boxer
 Wilma Rudolph, American sprinter, Olympian
 Justin Haley, NASCAR driver

Others 
 Jimmy Hoffa, American labor union leader

Notable Auxiliary Members 
 Virginia Graham, radio and TV personality
 Eleanor Roosevelt, wife of former U.S. President
 Bess Truman, wife of former U.S. President

See also
 List of Past Grand Madam Presidents
 List of Past Grand Worthy Presidents

Notes

References
 seattletimes.nwsource.com

External links

 

 
1898 establishments in Washington (state)
Organizations based in Seattle